Real Things is the third album by Belgian/Dutch Eurodance act 2 Unlimited, released in 1994. It was the band's second number one album in the UK and despite spending just nine weeks in the UK Albums Chart Top 75, it was certified gold there and platinum in The Netherlands. "The Real Thing", "Here I Go", "No One" and "Nothing Like the Rain" were released as singles. Unlike their previous album, Ray Slijngaard's raps on the verses were not cut for the UK release.

Critical reception

Generally, the music press were kinder to this album than previous album No Limits!. In his review of this album, Smash Hits''' Mark Sutherland stated that "every song is a potential top 10 record" and that "for techno [...] mayhem, you can't beat Real Things''".

Track listing
 "The Real Thing"  – 3:40
 "Do What I Like"  – 4:07
 "Here I Go"  – 5:10
 "Burning Like Fire"  – 4:54
 "Info Superhighway"  – 4:35
 "Hypnotised"  – 4:22
 "Tuning Into Something Wild"  – 4:05
 "Escape In Music"  – 3:52
 "Sensuality"  – 4:27
 "No One"  – 3:25
 "Face To Face"  – 4:03
 "What's Mine Is Mine"  – 4:57
 "Nothing Like the Rain"  – 4:39

Personnel
Adapted from AllMusic.

2 Unlimited – primary artist
Peter Bauwens – arranger, producer, vocal arrangement
Peter Bulkens – mixing
Jean-Paul DeCoster – arranger, executive producer, producer
Andy Janssens – remixing
Phil Wilde – arranger, composer, engineer, producer

Charts

Certifications and sales

References

1994 albums
2 Unlimited albums
Byte Records albums